Clarks Mills may refer to:

Clarks Mills, New Jersey
Clarks Mills, Wisconsin